Kanaga may refer to:
Kanaga Island in the Andreanof Islands group of the Aleutian Islands in Alaska
Kanaga Volcano, a volcano on Kanaga Island
Kanaga, Iran, a village in Ardabil Province, Iran
Kanaga, web series, KANAGA is an independent international Web Series starring Mehmet Günsür
Kanaga, a human effigy tribal figure on the original Flag of Mali